CompuTrac was the earliest technical analysis software originally made in 1979. The company that released it was founded by Jim Schmit and Tim Slater.

References

External links

Technical analysis software